The Amoroso–Robinson relation, named after economists Luigi Amoroso and Joan Robinson, describes the relation between price, marginal revenue, and elasticity of demand.

,

where 
 is the marginal revenue,
 is the particular good,
 is the good's price,
 is the price elasticity of demand.

Extension and generalization 

In 1967, Ernst Lykke Jensen published two extensions, one deterministic, the other probabilistic, of Amoroso–Robinson's formula.

See also 
 Lerner index
 Ramsey problem

References

Citations

Bibliography

Further reading 
 

Revenue